Sylwia Ejdys-Tomaszewska (born 15 July 1984 in Bogatynia) is a Polish middle distance runner who specialises in the 1500 metres. She competed in the event at the 2008 Summer Olympics. Her personal best for the distance is 4:02.30 minutes.

Ejdys had a share in the women's U23 team silver medal at the 2006 European Cross Country Championships alongside Katarzyna Kowalska. She claimed her first major win over 1500 metres at the 2007 European Cup. She was the bronze medallist at the 2007 World Student Games and became the 1500 m military champion at the 2007 Military World Games in October. She represented Poland at the 2008 Beijing Olympics, but did not make it past the first round of the 1500 m.

She moved up to the 3000 metres for the 2009 European Team Championships and came runner-up to Gulnara Samitova-Galkina. She reached the semi-finals of her speciality at the 2009 World Championships in Athletics. Ejdys narrowly missed a medal at the 2010 IAAF World Indoor Championships, coming in fourth place behind defending champion Gelete Burka. She reached the 1500 m final at the 2010 European Athletics Championships but performed poorly and finished dead last.

She improved her 3000 m personal best at the BW-Bank Meeting in February 2011, taking second place with a time of 8:43.22 minutes.

Achievements

References

External links

1984 births
Living people
People from Bogatynia
Polish female middle-distance runners
Athletes (track and field) at the 2008 Summer Olympics
Olympic athletes of Poland
Sportspeople from Lower Silesian Voivodeship
Universiade medalists in athletics (track and field)
Śląsk Wrocław athletes
Universiade bronze medalists for Poland
Medalists at the 2007 Summer Universiade
20th-century Polish women
21st-century Polish women